"Slave to the Grind" is a song by American rock band Skid Row, written by bandmates Sebastian Bach, Rachel Bolan, and Dave "The Snake" Sabo. It is title track from their second album, Slave to the Grind (1991), and was released as the album's second single on September 2, 1991. The song reached number 43 on the UK Singles Chart.

Music video
The video also got heavy rotation on MTV but was not as successful as previous singles and was not released in the United States.

Track listing
 "Slave to the Grind"
 "Creepshow"
 "C'Mon And Love Me" (originally performed by KISS)
 "Beggar's Day"

Charts

References

Skid Row (American band) songs
1991 singles
Atlantic Records singles
Songs against racism and xenophobia
Songs written by Dave Sabo
Songs written by Rachel Bolan
Speed metal songs